The Southeastern Athletic Conference (SEAC) was an intercollegiate athletic conference of historically black colleges and universities (HBCUs) that existed from 1929 to 1961.  It was known as the South Atlantic Intercollegiate Athletic Association between 1929 and 1942. The conference's members were located in Florida, Georgia, and South Carolina.

Member schools

Notes

Football champions

1929 – Claflin (SC)
1930 – South Carolina A&M
1931 – South Carolina A&M
1932 – Benedict and Paine
1933 – Claflin (SC)
1934 – Claflin (SC)
1935 – Claflin (SC)
1936 – Allen (SC)
1937 – Allen (SC)
1938 – Georgia State College
1939 – Allen (SC)
1940 – Allen (SC)

1941 – Allen (SC)
1942 – Bethune–Cookman
1943 – No champion
1944 – No champion
1945 – No champion
1946 – Allen (SC)
1947 – Bethune–Cookman
1948 – Georgia State College
1949 – Claflin (SC)
1950 – Savannah State
1951 – Morris (SC)

1952 – Morris (SC)
1953 – Claflin (SC)
1954 – Florida N&I
1955 – Albany State (GA)
1956 – Florida N&I and Savannah State
1957 – Florida N&I
1958 – Claflin (SC)
1959 – Albany State and Claflin (SC)
1960 – Albany State and Claflin (SC)
1961 – Edward Waters

See also
Southern Intercollegiate Athletic Conference
List of defunct college football conferences

References

 
College sports in Florida
College sports in Georgia (U.S. state)
College sports in South Carolina
1929 establishments in the United States
1961 disestablishments in the United States